Bruynseraede is a Flemish surname. Notable people with the surname include:

Roland Bruynseraede (born 1939), Belgian motorsport official
Yvan Bruynseraede (born 1938), Belgian physicist

Dutch-language surnames